St. John's Episcopal Church is a historic Episcopal church located on SR 1329 in Williamsboro, Vance County, North Carolina. It was built in 1773, and is a rectangular, seven bay long, frame church on a brick foundation.  It has a gable roof and is sheathed in weatherboard.  The church was restored in the 1950s.

It was added to the National Register of Historic Places in 1971.

References

External links

Historic American Buildings Survey in North Carolina
Episcopal church buildings in North Carolina
Churches on the National Register of Historic Places in North Carolina
Churches completed in 1773
Churches in Vance County, North Carolina
National Register of Historic Places in Vance County, North Carolina
18th-century Episcopal church buildings